Malcom Bokele Mputu (born 12 February 2000) is a professional footballer who plays as centre-back for  club Bordeaux. Born in France, he is a youth international for Cameroon.

Club career
Bokele is a youth product of the academies of AS Bellecour Perrache, Eveil Lyon, Lyon and FC Lyon. He began his senior career with the reserves of FBBP01 in 2017. He followed that up with a stint with the reserves of FC Metz from 2017 to 2019. In October 2019, he moved to the reserves of Bordeaux. On 1 June 2021, he signed his first professional contract with Bordeaux for 3 years. He joined Villefranche on 29 January 2022 for the second half of the 2021-22 season in the Championnat National. Moving to the Bordeaux senior team for the 2022-23 season, he made his professional debut with them in a 0–0 Ligue 2 tie with Valenciennes on 22 August 2022.

International career
Bokele was born in France to a Congolese father and Cameroonian mother. He was called up to the Cameroon U23s in October 2021.

References

External links

2000 births
Living people
Footballers from Lyon
Cameroonian footballers
Cameroon youth international footballers
French footballers
Cameroonian people of Democratic Republic of the Congo descent
French sportspeople of Cameroonian descent
French sportspeople of Democratic Republic of the Congo descent
Association football defenders
Football Bourg-en-Bresse Péronnas 01 players
FC Metz players
FC Girondins de Bordeaux players
FC Villefranche Beaujolais players
Ligue 2 players
Championnat National players
Championnat National 3 players
Black French sportspeople